Elefant of Nîmes was a medieval bishop coadjutor of the Diocese of Nîmes from 1066,
He was coadjudicator for his first 11 years with Frotaire II, sole bishop for 4 years and then shared the see with Pierre I. Ermangaud for his last four years.

See also 
Catholic Church in France

References

11th-century French Roman Catholic bishops
Bishops of Nîmes